Teonthar Assembly constituency is one of the 8 Vidhan Sabha (Legislative Assembly) constituencies of Rewa District and of the 230 constituencies of Madhya Pradesh state in central India.

This constituency came into being since 1962 Legislative Assembly elections.

The incumbent MLA is Shyamlal Dwivedi from BJP since 2018 elections.

Electoral results 
Latest elections were held on 28 November 2018.

See also
 Teonthar

References

Assembly constituencies of Madhya Pradesh